Guzmania gracilior is a species of flowering plant in the Bromeliaceae family. It is native to Ecuador and Colombia.

References

gracilior
Flora of Ecuador
Flora of Colombia
Plants described in 1889
Taxa named by Édouard André
Taxa named by Carl Christian Mez